Felix Eduardo Torres Caicedo (born 11 January 1997) is an Ecuadorian professional footballer who plays as a defender for Liga MX club Santos Laguna and the Ecuador national team.

After beginning his career with LDU Portoviejo, Torres signed for Barcelona in 2017 before joining Santos Laguna in 2019. He made his international debut in 2019 and represented Ecuador at both the 2021 Copa America and the 2022 FIFA World Cup.

Club career
Torres began his career with LDU Portoviejo before signing for Ecuadorian Serie A side Barcelona in December 2026, on an initial one-year loan deal. He made his debut for the side in a 2–1 victory over Macará on 2 July and scored his first goal in a win over Guayaquil City F.C. on 5 November. Two weeks later, Torres joined the club permanently in November 2017 having made six appearances during his loan spell, signing a six-year contract.

In January 2019 Torres transferred over to Mexican club Santos Laguna, following his former Barcelona coach Guillermo Almada who had taken charge of the side. In October 2019 Torres was punished for indiscipline by the club and as of November 2019 has not played since.

International career

After playing for Ecuador at the 2017 FIFA U-20 World Cup Torres was called up for the national team in February 2017 but did not play.

Torres was named in the Ecuadorian squad for the 2022 FIFA World Cup, playing in all three of his nation's matches as they were eliminated in the group stage.

References

External links

1997 births
Living people
Ecuadorian footballers
Ecuador under-20 international footballers
Ecuador international footballers
Ecuadorian Serie A players
L.D.U. Portoviejo footballers
Barcelona S.C. footballers
Santos Laguna footballers
Liga MX players
2021 Copa América players
Ecuadorian expatriate footballers
Ecuadorian expatriate sportspeople in Mexico
Expatriate footballers in Mexico
Association football defenders
People from San Lorenzo, Ecuador
2022 FIFA World Cup players